The NCAA Division II Women's Tennis Championship is the National Collegiate Athletic Association's annual tennis tournament to determine the team champions of women's collegiate tennis from Division II institutions in the United States.

From its establishment in 1982 until 1994, the championship consisted of three championships: singles, doubles, and team. However, the singles and doubles titles were discontinued after 1994 and have not been reestablished.

Armstrong State, with eight titles, is the most successful program, while Barry, with five titles, leads among active Division II programs.

Barry are the current champions, defeating Lynn in the 2019 final.

History
Tennis was one of twelve women's sports added to the NCAA championship program for the 1981–82 school year, as the NCAA engaged in battle with the Association for Intercollegiate Athletics for Women for sole governance of women's collegiate sports. The AIAW continued to conduct its established championship program in the same twelve (and other) sports; however, after a year of dual women's championships, the NCAA conquered the AIAW and usurped its authority and membership.

Champions

Singles, Doubles, and Team titles (1982–1994)

Team title only (1995–present)

Champions

Team titles

Singles titles

Doubles titles

 Schools highlighted in pink are closed or no longer sponsor athletics.
 Schools highlight in yellow have reclassified to another NCAA division.

See also
NCAA Women's Tennis Championships (Division I, Division III)
AIAW Intercollegiate Women's Tennis Champions
NAIA Women's Tennis Championship
NCAA Men's Tennis Championships (Division I, Division II, Division III)

References

External links
NCAA Division II Women's Tennis

Tennis, Women's
College tennis in the United States
Tennis tournaments in the United States
Women's tennis in the United States